Li Kui may refer to:  

Li Kui (legalist), government minister in the Wei state
Li Kui (chancellor), chancellor of the Tang Dynasty
Li Kui (Water Margin), fictional character in the Water Margin